The Workers' Party is a Trotskyist Uruguayan political party participating in the Coordinating Committee for the Refoundation of the Fourth International.

Its presence is testimonial. In the 2019 general election it obtained 1,387 votes.

Electoral history

Presidential elections

Chamber of Deputies and Senate elections

References

External links
 (in Spanish)
Sitio oficial de la Coordinadora por la Refundación de la Cuarta Internacional

1984 establishments in Uruguay
Communist parties in Uruguay
Coordinating Committee for the Refoundation of the Fourth International
Political parties established in 1984
Trotskyist organizations in Uruguay